Elkosh is a moshav in northern Israel. Located near Ma'alot-Tarshiha and the Lebanese border, it falls under the jurisdiction of Ma'ale Yosef Regional Council.

History
The village was established in 1949 by immigrants from Yemen. It is located on the  land of the Palestinian villages of Dayr al-Qassi and Al-Mansura, both depopulated in the 1948 Arab–Israeli War.

It was named after the biblical city of Elkosh, birth-town of prophet Nahum (Nahum 1:1), which was located in the area. The founders were later joined by more immigrants from Kurdistan.

References

Moshavim
Populated places established in 1949
Populated places in Northern District (Israel)
Yemeni-Jewish culture in Israel
1949 establishments in Israel